Zhou Jun (5 February 1932 – 27 March 2020) was a Chinese scientist specializing in plant resources and phytochemistry. He was a member of the Communist Party of China and an academician of the Chinese Academy of Sciences.

Biography
Zhou was born into a family of teachers, in Dongtai, Jiangsu, on February 5, 1932. He had five brothers. He elementary studied at the School affiliated to Danyang National Institute of Social Education and secondary studied at Nanjing National Pharmaceutical School. After graduation, he worked at East China Pharmaceutical College and then East China Health Bureau. He joined the Communist Party of China in April 1949. In September 1954, he was accepted to East China Institute of Chemical Technology (now East China University of Science and Technology), where he majored in pharmaceutical engineering. After graduating in September 1958, he was dispatched to Kunming Institute of Botany, where he was promoted to associate research fellow in 1978 and to  research fellow in 1986. He was its director in January 1983, and held that office until January 1990. On March 27, 2020, he died of illness in Kunming, Yunnan, at the age of 88.

Personal life
Zhou married Chen Siying, they had three children.

Honours and awards
 October 1999 Member of the Chinese Academy of Sciences (CAS)

References

1932 births
2020 deaths
People from Dongtai
Scientists from Jiangsu
East China University of Science and Technology alumni
Members of the Chinese Academy of Sciences